Delftia is a genus of Gram-negative bacteria that was first isolated from soil in Delft, Netherlands. The species is named after both the city, and in honor of pioneering research in the field of bacteriology that occurred in Delft. Cells in the genus Delftia are rod shaped and straight or slightly curved. Cells occur singly or in pairs, are 0.4–0.8ɥM wide and 2.5–4.1ɥM long. Delftia are motile by flagella, non-sporulating, and chemo-organotrophic.

Species
 D. acidovorans 
 D. deserti 
 D. lacustris 
 D. litopenaei 
 D. tsuruhatensis
 D. rhizosphaerae

Uses
Delftia species are known for their unique metabolic abilities to break down or transform a variety of pollutants. Delftia can degrade acetaminophen, PAHs, chloroaniline, and herbicides. It can also detoxify heavy metals such as cadmium and gold.

References

Comamonadaceae
Bacteria genera